Lentibacillus sediminis is a Gram-positive, rod-shaped, moderately halophilic, facultatively anaerobic, endospore-forming and motile bacterium from the genus of Lentibacillus which has been isolated from a marine saltern from Wendeng.

References

Bacillaceae
Bacteria described in 2008